Petterson is a Scandinavian and Dutch surname. Notable people with the surname include:

 Andy Petterson (born 1969), Australian soccer player
 Donald K. Petterson (born 1930), United States foreign service officer 
 Pelle Petterson (born 1932), Swedish yachtsman and boat designer
 Per Petterson (born 1952), Norwegian novelist

See also
 Pettersson
 Patterson (surname), Patterson (disambiguation)
 Peterson (name)
 Petersen

Patronymic surnames